Mateusz Żebrowski (born 5 July 1995) is a Polish professional footballer who plays as a forward for I liga club Arka Gdynia.

Honours

Club
Arka Gdynia
 Polish Cup runner-up: 2020–21

References

External links
 

Polish footballers
Poland youth international footballers
1995 births
Living people
Association football forwards
Jagiellonia Białystok players
Wigry Suwałki players
Legionovia Legionowo players
Arka Gdynia players
Ekstraklasa players
I liga players
II liga players
III liga players